Phragmatopoma is a genus of polychaetes belonging to the family Sabellariidae.

The species of this genus are found in America.

Species:

Phragmatopoma attenuata 
Phragmatopoma balbinae 
Phragmatopoma californica 
Phragmatopoma carlosi 
Phragmatopoma caudata 
Phragmatopoma digitata 
Phragmatopoma moerchi 
Phragmatopoma peruensis 
Phragmatopoma villalobosi 
Phragmatopoma virgini

References

Annelids